Jomon T. John  (born 17 February 1982) is an Indian cinematographer and producer who works predominantly in Malayalam cinema. Jomon made his debut with Chaappa Kurishu (2011). Jomon won the 2015 Kerala State Film Award for Best Cinematography for the films Nee-Na, Ennu Ninte Moideen, and Charlie. 

His well-known films include Beautiful (2011), Thattathin Marayathu (2012),  Ayalum Njanum Thammil (2012), Vikramadithyan (2014), Ennu Ninte Moideen (2015), Charlie (2015), Jacobinte Swargarajyam (2016), and Thanneer Mathan Dinangal (2019). He also worked on Hindi films such as Golmaal Again (2017), Simmba (2018), and Sooryavanshi (2020). Jomon made his debut as a producer by co-producing the film Thanneer Mathan Dinangal. Jomon is also one among the members of the Indian Society of Cinematographers.

Career

Jomon completed his diploma in cinematography from Government Film and Television Institute, Bangalore. He subsequently became active in the advertisement film industry. He made his feature film debut when Sameer Thahir signed him as the cinematographer of his debut directorial, Chaappa Kurish (2011) after which he went on become a part of many successful films. In 2015, his work in Picket 43 , Ennu Ninte Moideen,  Charlie and Oru Vadakkan Selfie were highly acclaimed, he was soon signed by Tamil filmmaker Gautham Vasudev Menon for the Dhanush-starrer Enai Noki Paayum Thota. After completion of the film, Menon also signed him for his next Dhruva Natchathiram and filmed a 2:49 second teaser in New York City. But soon, Jomon opted out of the film as it was rescheduled, and the new schedule clashed with the dates he had earlier allocated for Rohit Shetty's Golmaal Again.

Personal life

Jomon married actress Ann Augustine on 2 February 2014.

Filmography

As guest cinematographer
Sahasam Swasaga Sagipo (Telugu film) Shot 1 Song only.
Dhruva Natchathiram (Teaser)

Awards
Kerala State Film Awards
Best Cinematographer for Charlie, Ennu Ninte Moideen, Nee-Na

Asianet Film Awards 2011
 Best Cinematographer for Beautiful

2nd South Indian International Movie Awards
 Nominated - Best Cinematographer for Thattathin Marayathu

3rd South Indian International Movie Awards
 Best Cinematographer for Thira

References

External links
 

Living people
People from Alappuzha district
Kerala State Film Award winners
1981 births